Zhu Youlin (born 1962) is a Chinese academic and politician. He is a vice-president of Nanchang University, as well as a representative for Jiangxi province in the 11th National People's Congress.

References

1962 births
Living people
Delegates to the 11th National People's Congress
People's Republic of China politicians from Hubei
Politicians from Xiantao
Educators from Hubei